FK Detonit Plačkovica is a football club from Radoviš, North Macedonia. They are currently competing in the Macedonian Second League.

History

The club was founded in 1942. In 2022, the club was merged with FK Detonit Junior and youth team Azzurri and since then it has been called Detonit Plačkovica.

Supporters
FK Detonit Plačkovica's supporters are called Lebari Istok (Bread makers East), who were founded in 1991 and also support the local handball team, RK Radoviš.

Current squad
.

Honours
 Macedonian Second League:
Third place (2): 1995–96, 1997–98

References

External links
FK Plačkovica Facebook
Club info at MacedonianFootball 
Football Federation of Macedonia 

Football clubs in North Macedonia
Association football clubs established in 1942
1942 establishments in Yugoslavia
FK